Berzovia is a commune in Caraș-Severin County, Banat, Romania with a population of 4,165 people. It is composed of three villages: Berzovia, Fizeș (Krassófűzes) and Gherteniș (Gertenyes).

It is mentioned on the Tabula Peutingeriana as Berzobia. The Roman fort of Bersobis is located in Berzovia.

References 

Communes in Caraș-Severin County
Localities in Romanian Banat